The 1953 National Challenge Cup was the 40th edition of the USSFA's annual open soccer championship. The Chicago Falcons defeated the Harmarville Hurricanes (a suburban Pittsburgh team) to win.

External links
1953 U.S. Open Cup – TheCup.us

Lamar Hunt U.S. Open Cup
U.S. Open Cup